Visma Solutions is a Finnish joint stock company, which offers SaaS business software for companies.  The company produces professional services automation software, E-accounting software, budgeting and forecasting software, e-invoicing service software, and an online signature service. Visma Solutions is part of the Visma group.

History 
Visma Severa was founded in 2004 by Ari-Pekka Salovaara and Jari Kärkkäinen, who were studying at Lappeenranta University of Technology at the time. In 2010 company was acquired by Visma and from 2013 on has been part of Visma Solutions.

Visma Solutions was founded in the end of year 2012, when former joint stock company called Netvisor was named as Visma Solutions. Netvisor was founded by Markku Nylund, while he studied at Lappeenranta University of Technology. In 2000 Netvisor was merged with Bittivisio and the first version of the software was launched in 2002. Two later Cap Gemini Ernst & Young bought Bittivisio, but sold Netvisor’s business already in 2005 to Solanum Networks Economic Administration. From 2011 on Netvisor has been part of Visma group and in the end of 2012 the company’s name was changed to Visma Solutions.

In November 2020, Visma acquired Danish software company Ditmer.

Products 

 Visma Severa PSA software, which is optimized for organizations such as PR, advertising, design, IT, engineering, law, architecture and accounting firms.

 Visma Netvisor is e-accounting software. The software has been developed over 10 years and it is one of the pioneers in the field of e-accounting and SaaS software.
 Maventa is an e-invoicing service suitable for SME’s to multinational corporations.
 ValueFrame is a PSA software suited for architects, advertising and communication agencies and consultants.
 Visma Sign is a legally binding online signature service. Visma Sign can be integrated to online forms for immediate signing, or used to send signing invitations via email and text messages.

References

External links 
 Visma Severa website
 Netvisor website (in Finnish)

Cloud computing providers
Business software companies